Marcelo Lomba do Nascimento (born 18 December 1986), is a Brazilian footballer who plays as a goalkeeper for Série A club Palmeiras.

Career

Flamengo
In 2006, Lomba had his first chance in the professional team, but only in 2008, in a Campeonato Carioca derby match against Vasco da Gama on April 6, 2008, he had played his first official match for the club, the match ended in a 2–2 draw. Despite this first chance, Lomba didn't have much space as he was, at that time, the squad's third goalkeeper after Diego and Bruno.

In 2010, with the departure of Diego for Ceará, the young archer became the team's second keeper, and gradually established himself as a starter after Bruno had left the club due to criminal issues.

For the 2011 season Flamengo loaned Lomba to Brazilian Série B club Ponte Preta to get more first team experience. But due to contractual problems he couldn't be loaned and returned to Flamengo.

Bahia (loan)
After few more months training with Flamengo, Lomba has been loaned to Bahia until May 2012.

Internacional
Internacional acquired Lomba from Bahia on 15 July 2016, for a fee of R$2 million. Lomba became the number one choice on Inter's goal in 2018 after Danilo Fernandes' injuries. He was subsequently named best goalkeeper of the 2018 Campeonato Brasileiro, helping the club achieve a 3rd place, securing a spot on the next season's Copa Libertadores.

Palmeiras 
In December 2021, Lomba signed a one-year contract with Palmeiras.

Career statistics

Honours

Clubs
Flamengo
Copa do Brasil: 2006
Campeonato Carioca: 2007, 2008, 2009, 2011
Campeonato Brasileiro Série A: 2009

Bahia
Campeonato Baiano: 2012, 2014

Palmeiras
Campeonato Brasileiro Série A: 2022
Recopa Sudamericana: 2022
Campeonato Paulista: 2022

National team
FIFA U-17 World Championship: 2003

Individual
Campeonato Brasileiro Série A Team of the Year: 2018

References

External links
Flapédia 

globoesporte 
 
 

1986 births
Living people
Footballers from Rio de Janeiro (city)
Brazilian footballers
CR Flamengo footballers
Esporte Clube Bahia players
Associação Atlética Ponte Preta players
Sport Club Internacional players
Sociedade Esportiva Palmeiras players
Campeonato Brasileiro Série A players
Campeonato Brasileiro Série B players
Association football goalkeepers